Fort Pitt Farms Christian Community is a Christian Community of Dariusleut Hutterite origin and of many Hutterite traditions, but that is fully autonomous since 1999. It is located in Frenchman Butte, Saskatchewan, Canada close to Fort Pitt Provincial Park. Its spiritual leaders are Reuben Walter and Ben Walter.

What today is Fort Pitt Farms Christian Community was founded in 1969 as a Hutterite colony, a division from the Ribstone Hutterite Colony. When the Fort Pitt Hutterite Colony was excommunicated from the Hutterite church in 1999, about one-third of the people of the colony decided to stay with the Dariusleut Hutterites. The colony then established another colony, Greenleaf Hutterite Colony, Marcelin, Saskatchewan, to accommodate those who wished to stay with the Hutterite Church.

There are about 160 people living in Fort Pitt Farms Christian Community, mostly of ethnic Hutterite background.

Fort Pitt Farms is affiliated with Elmendorf Christian Community and its daughter colonies  Detention River in Tasmania and Grand River in Missouri and also with the Altona Christian Community at Henderson, Minnesota.

See also 

Elmendorf Christian Community

References 

Christian communities
Hutterite communities in Canada